Harald V (born 21 February 1937) is King of Norway. He succeeded to the throne on 17 January 1991.

Harald was the third child and only son of King Olav V of Norway and Princess Märtha of Sweden. He was second in the line of succession at the time of his birth, behind his father. In 1940, as a result of the German occupation during World War II, the royal family went into exile. Harald spent part of his childhood in Sweden and the United States. He returned to Norway in 1945, and subsequently studied for periods at the University of Oslo, the Norwegian Military Academy, and Balliol College, Oxford.

Following the death of his grandfather Haakon VII in 1957, Harald became crown prince as his father became king. A keen sportsman, he represented Norway in sailing at the 1964, 1968, and 1972 Olympic Games, and later became patron of World Sailing. Harald married Sonja Haraldsen in 1968, their relationship having initially been controversial due to her status as a commoner. They have two children, Märtha Louise and Haakon. Harald became king following his father's death in 1991, with Haakon becoming his heir apparent.

Early life and education

Birth 

Prince Harald was born at the Skaugum estate during the reign of his grandfather King Haakon VII and was baptised in the Royal Chapel of the Royal Palace in Oslo on 31 March 1937 by Bishop Johan Lunde. His godparents were: his paternal grandparents King Haakon VII and Queen Maud of Norway; his maternal grandparents Prince Carl and Princess Ingeborg of Sweden; King Leopold III of Belgium; Queen Mary and King George VI of the United Kingdom; and Crown Princess Ingrid of Denmark. His parents already had two daughters, Princess Ragnhild and Princess Astrid.

At the time of Harald's birth, he was 2nd in line of succession to the Norwegian throne following his father, Crown Prince Olav.

Second World War 

In 1940 the entire royal family had to flee Oslo because of the German invasion. It was deemed safer for the family to split up. The King and Crown Prince Olav would remain in Norway and the Crown Princess was to make her way to Sweden with the three children. The latter party reached Sweden on the night of 10 April, but although Crown Princess Märtha was Swedish-born, they encountered problems at the border station. According to Princess Astrid and others who were present, they were admitted only after the driver threatened to ram the border gate. Another account does not describe the escape so dramatically. However, when the King and Crown Prince inquired of Swedish foreign minister Christian Günther whether they could sleep one night in Sweden without being interned, their request was refused.

Harald spent the following days in Sälen before moving to Prince Carl Bernadotte's home in Frötuna on 16 April. On 26 April the group moved to Drottningholm in Stockholm. King Gustaf V has been accounted to have had an amicable relationship with his Norwegian guests, but the topic of the war in Norway was not to be raised. However, influential Swedish politicians, including Minister of Justice Westman, wanted the Crown Princess and Prince Harald to be sent back to Norway so he could be proclaimed King by the Germans. After the King and Crown Prince had to leave Norway on 7 June they felt Sweden might not be the best place for the rest of the family, and started planning for them to go to the United States. On 17 August the Crown Princess and her children left for the United States from Petsamo, Finland, aboard the United States Army transport ship .

Harald, his mother, and his sisters lived in Washington, D.C. during the war, while his father, Crown Prince Olav, and his grandfather, King Haakon, stayed in London with the Norwegian government-in-exile. One of the notable events he remembers from that time is standing behind Franklin D. Roosevelt when he was sworn in for his fourth term on the South Portico of the White House in 1945. Such childhood experiences are reflected in a trace of an American accent when he speaks English. The Doris Kearns Goodwin book No Ordinary Time: Franklin and Eleanor Roosevelt and the Home Front in World War II contains a picture of the King (then Prince) playing with FDR's dog, Fala, on the North Lawn of the White House in 1944.

Harald visited Norwegian servicemen training in the United States. The prince also made visits outside America, travelling north to visit Norwegian personnel at the training base "Little Norway" in Ontario, Canada. He attended The White Hall Country School from 1943. Prince Harald returned to Norway with his family at the war's end in 1945.

Return 
In the autumn of 1945 he was enrolled in third grade of Smestad skole as the first member of the royal family to attend a public (state) school. Amidst this when he was only 17 years old in 1954, his mother died of cancer. The Crown Princess's death was a tremendous loss for him and his family as well as for Norway, and he named his daughter Märtha to honour her memory. Four years later in 1958 he would lose his maternal grandmother Princess Ingeborg of Denmark.

Crown Prince 

In 1955 he graduated from Oslo katedralskole and in the autumn of that year, Harald began studies at the University of Oslo. He later attended the Cavalry Officers' Candidate School at Trandum, followed by enrollment at the Norwegian Military Academy, from which he graduated in 1959.  On 21 September 1957 at the death of his grandfather, Harald became crown prince at the age of 20 and he attended the Council of State for the first time six days later and took the oath to the Constitution of Norway on 21 February 1958. In the same year, he also served as regent in the King's absence for the first time.

In 1960, Harald entered Balliol College, Oxford where he studied history, economics and politics. He was a keen rower during his student days at Oxford and was taught to row by fellow student and friend Nick Bevan, later a leading British school rowing coach. In 1960, he also made his first official journey abroad, visiting the United States in connection with the fiftieth anniversary of the American Scandinavian Foundation. An avid sailor, Harald represented Norway in the yachting events of the Summer Olympics in Tokyo in 1964, Mexico City in 1968, and Munich in 1972. The Crown Prince carried the Norwegian flag at the opening parade of the 1964 Summer Olympics. Harald is an honorary president of the International Soling Association.

Marriage 
Harald married Sonja Haraldsen at Oslo Domkirke in Oslo on 29 August 1968. The pair had dated for nine years, but Olav was reluctant to allow his son to marry a commoner. Olav only relented when Harald told his father that if he was not allowed to marry Sonja he would not marry at all. This would have ended the reign of his family and the Norwegian monarchy, as Harald was the sole heir to the throne. The couple have two children, Princess Märtha Louise and Crown Prince Haakon, heir apparent to the Norwegian throne.

Reign 
On the death of his father on 17 January 1991, Harald succeeded to the Norwegian throne. He became the first Norwegian-born monarch since Olav IV died in 1387, a gap of 604 years. Harald is the sixth King of Norway to bear that name, and the first in 855 years. The five other kings who have borne the name are Harald Fairhair, Harald Greycloak, Harald Bluetooth, Harald Hardrada, and Harald Gille. Harald Bluetooth is usually not given a number in the Norwegian list of kings, therefore Harald is 'only' numbered as Harald V. King Harald made the decision to use his grandfather's royal motto, "Alt for Norge". The King also chose to continue the tradition of royal benediction, a tradition that had been introduced with his father, and was consecrated together with Queen Sonja in the Nidaros Cathedral on 23 June 1991.

The reign of King Harald has been marked by modernization and reform for the Norwegian Royal family. The King has cooperated closely with Queen Sonja and the Crown Prince in making the royal household more open to the Norwegian public and the Norwegian media. King Harald's decision to accept two more commoners into the royal family, Crown Princess Mette-Marit and Ari Behn, has been interpreted as a sign of modernization and adjustment. Under King Harald and Queen Sonja's leadership, comprehensive renovation projects on the Bygdøy Royal Estate, the Royal Palace, the royal stables and Oscarshall have also taken place. The latter three have also been opened to the public and tourists. Together with Queen Sonja, the king has also for decades attempted to establish a palace museum in Oslo.

Constitutional role 

While the Constitution vests the King with executive power, he is not politically responsible for exercising it. This is in accordance not only with provisions of the Constitution, but with conventions established since the definitive establishment of parliamentary rule in Norway in 1884. His acts are not valid without the countersignature of a member of the Council of State (cabinet)–usually the Prime Minister–and proceedings of the Council of State are signed by all of its members. Although he nominally has the power of veto, no Norwegian king has exercised it since the dissolution of the union with Sweden in 1905. Even then, the King's veto power is suspensive, not absolute as is the case with British monarchs. A royal veto can be overridden if the Storting passes the same bill following a general election.

While the Constitution nominally vests the King with the power to appoint the government, in practice it is impossible for a King to keep a government in office against the will of Parliament. By convention, the King appoints the leader of the parliamentary bloc with the majority as prime minister. When the parliamentary situation is unclear, the King relies on the advice of the President of Parliament and the sitting prime minister. Unlike most constitutional monarchs, Harald does not have the power to dissolve Parliament; the Constitution does not allow snap elections.

The King meets with the Council of State at the Royal Palace every Friday. He also has weekly meetings with the Prime Minister and the Minister of Foreign Affairs. He receives foreign envoys, and formally opens parliament every October delivering a speech from the throne during each opening. He travels extensively throughout Norway and makes official state visits to other countries, as well as receiving and hosting guests.

Until 2012, the King of Norway was, according to the constitution, the formal head of the Church of Norway. The constitutional amendment of 21 May 2012 made the King no longer the formal head, but he is still required to be of the Evangelical Lutheran religion.

On 8 May 2018, the King's constitutional status as holy was dissolved, while leaving his sovereign immunity intact.

Sporting role 
In 1994, both the King and Crown Prince Haakon played roles during the opening ceremony of the Lillehammer Olympics. The King opened the games, while the Crown Prince lit the cauldron, paying tribute to both the King and his grandfather as Olympians. The King has also represented Norway at opening ceremonies of Olympic Games, among them Torino and Beijing. However, he wasn't present in Vancouver; the Crown Prince attended instead, with the King and Queen attending later in the games.

With his sailing crew he won World Championship bronze, silver and gold medals, in 1988, 1982 and 1987, respectively. In July 2005, the King and his crew aboard the royal sailboat Fram XV won the gold medal at the European Championships in Sweden. In the 2007 World Championship the King came in sixth place.

Recent years 

King Harald's leadership during Norwegian national crises, such as the New Year's Day Storm (1992), July 2011 massacre, 2020 Gjerdrum landslide, and with particularly COVID-19 pandemic (January 2020 to March 2022), which has been met with both national and international acclaim.

In 2015, he became the world's first reigning monarch to visit Antarctica, specifically the Norwegian dependency Queen Maud Land. In 2016, King Harald V competed with a team for the sailing World Championships on Lake Ontario, Toronto. The king came second in the classic fleet category. He was dubbed "Sailor-King" by Canada's National Post as he slept on board his yacht Sira.

In 2016 Harald, in a speech marking 25 years on the throne, sought to unify Norwegians coming from Afghanistan and Pakistan as well as "girls who love girls, boys who love boys and girls and boys who love each other."

Since the start of the twenty-first century King Harald has been unable to perform his duties as sovereign due to ill health on a few occasions: from December 2003 to mid-April 2004 due to urinary bladder cancer, from April to early June 2005 due to aortic stenosis, and in 2020 he was in hospital for cardiac surgery (replacement of a heart valve). Crown Prince Haakon served as the country's regent on these occasions, including giving the King's Speech at the State opening of parliament in 2020.

When the King and Queen turned 80 years old in 2017, the King decided to open the former royal stables to the public as a gift to his wife, the Queen. The new venue was named The Queen Sonja Art Stable and is the first institution owned by the royal family which is permanently open to the public. King Harald was made Name of the Year by the newspaper VG in 2017.

On 17 January 2021, King Harald celebrated 30 years on the throne of Norway. On 11 September 2022, King Harald visited Denmark to celebrate the Golden Jubilee of Queen Margrethe II of Denmark.

Titles, styles, and arms

Titles 
21 February 1937 – 21 September 1957: His Royal Highness Prince Harald of Norway
21 September 1957 – 17 January 1991: His Royal Highness The Crown Prince of Norway
Since 17 January 1991: His Majesty The King

Arms

Honours and medals 

The King is a four-star general, an admiral, and formally the Supreme Commander of the Norwegian Armed Forces. The infantry battalion His Majesty the King's Guard are considered the King's and the Royal Family's bodyguards. They guard the Royal residences, including the Royal Palace, the Crown Prince Residence at Skaugum, and the Royal Mausoleum at Akershus Castle.

National honours and medals 
The King is Grand Master of the Royal Norwegian Order of St. Olav and the Royal Norwegian Order of Merit.

 – Grand Master of the Royal Norwegian Order of St Olav – Grand Cross with collar of the Royal Norwegian Order of St. Olav°
 – Grand Master of the Royal Norwegian Order of Merit – Grand Cross°
 – St Olav's medal°
 – Defence Service Medal with Laurel Branch°
 – Royal House Centennial Medal°
 – King Haakon VII Commemorative Medal 1. October 1957°
 – King Haakon VII 1905–1955 Jubilee Medal°
 – Haakon VIIs Centenary Medal°
 – Olav Vs Commemorative Medal of 30. January 1991°
 – Olav Vs Jubilee Medal°
 – Olav Vs Centenary Medal°
 – Defence Service Medal with three stars°
 – Army National Service Medal with three stars°
 – Krigsdeltakerforbundet Badge of Honour°
 – Norwegian Red Cross Badge of Honour°
 – Norwegian Reserve Officers Federal Badge of Honour°
 – The Naval Society Medal of Merit in gold°
 – Norwegian Shooting Society Badge of Honour°
 – The Norwegian Confederation of Sports Centenary Medal°
 – Norwegian Shooting Society Commemorative Medal in gold°
 – Oslo Military Society Badge of Honour in Gold°

Foreign honours 
In the British Army, Harald V was the final Colonel-in-Chief of the Green Howards. He is also an honorary Colonel in the British Royal Marines. He is patron of the Anglo-Norse Society in London, formerly together with Queen Elizabeth II, his second cousin. Harald is in the line of succession to the British throne, because of his descent from King Edward VII of the United Kingdom. He is a Stranger Knight of the Garter, an Honorary Knight Grand Cross of the Royal Victorian Order, and a Recipient of the Royal Victorian Chain, as well as numerous other orders of chivalry.

Northern European countries 
 – Grand Cross with Collar of the Order of the Falcon °
 – Knight with Collar of the Order of the Seraphim °
 – Gustaf Vs 90th Anniversary Medal °
 –  HM King Carl XVI Gustaf 50th Anniversary Medal
 – Knight with Collar of the Order of the Elephant °
 – Grand Commander of the Order of the Dannebrog °
 – Commander Grand Cross with Collar of the Order of the White Rose of Finland °
 – Collar of the Order of the Cross of Terra Mariana °
 – Collar of the Order of the White Star
 – Commander Grand Cross with Chain of the Order of the Three Stars °
 – Grand Cross of the Order of Viesturs °
 – Grand Cross (1998) with Golden Chain (2011) of the Order of Vytautas the Great °
 – Recipient of the Royal Victorian Chain (1994) °
 – Honorary Knight Grand Cross of the Royal Victorian Order (1955) °
 – Stranger Knight of the Order of the Garter (990th member; 2001) °
 – Honorary Freedom of Newcastle upon Tyne (November 2008)

Other countries 
  – Collar of the Order of the Liberator General San Martín
 – Grand Star of the Decoration of Honour for Services to the Republic of Austria (1964) °
 – Grand Cordon of the Order of Leopold °
 – Grand Collar of the Order of the Southern Cross °
 – Grand Cross of the Order of the Balkan Mountains °
 – Collar of the Order of Merit °
 – Grand Order of King Tomislav °
 – Grand Cross of the Légion d'honneur °
 – Grand Cross Special Class of the Order of Merit of the Federal Republic of Germany °
 – Grand Cross of the Order of the Redeemer °
 – The Royal House of Greece Centenary Medal °
 – Grand Cross with Collar of the Order of Merit of the Republic of Hungary °
  IOC – The Golden Olympic order °
 – Knight Grand Cross (06/1965) with Collar (10/2001) of the Order of Merit of the Italian Republic °
 – Grand Cordon with Collar of the Order of the Chrysanthemum °
 – Grand Cordon with Collar of the Order of al-Hussein bin Ali °
 – Order of the Yugoslav Great Star °
 – Grand Cross of the Order of Adolph of Nassau °
 – Knight of the Order of the Gold Lion of the House of Nassau°
 – Medal to commemorate the wedding of Grand Duke Jean and Grand Duchess Joséphine-Charlotte °
 – Knight Grand Cross of the Order of the Netherlands Lion °
 – Grand Cross of the Order of the Crown °
 – Commander of the Order of the Golden Ark °
 – Medal to commemorate the enthronement of Queen Beatrix °
 – Knight Grand Cross of the Order of the White Eagle °
 – Grand Cross of the Military Order of Aviz (05/11/1980) °
 – Grand Collar of the Order of Infante Dom Henrique (13 February 2004) °
 – Grand Collar of the Order of St. James of the Sword (26 May 2008) °
 – Sash Rank of the Order of the Star of Romania °
 – Grand Cross (or 1st Class) of the Order of the White Double Cross (2010) °
 : Recipient of the Decoration for Exceptional Merits (2011) °
 – 1,192nd Knight and Collar of the Order of the Golden Fleece (21 April 1995) °
 – Knight Grand Cross of the  Order of Charles III (12/04/1982) °
 – Collar of the  Order of Charles III (30 June 2006) °
 – Grand Cross of the Order of Good Hope °
  – Recipient of the Grand Order of Mugunghwa °
 – Knight of the Order of the Royal House of Chakri (19 September 1960)°
 – Knight Grand Cordon (Special Class) of the Order of Chula Chom Klao °
 – First Class of the Order of the State of Republic of Turkey °

The mark ° shows honours mentioned on his official website page about decorations

Miscellaneous honours 
Harald V received an honorary degree of Doctor of Civil Law from Oxford University in 2006 (as did his father, King Olav, in 1937, and his grandfather, King Haakon, in 1943). The King also received honorary doctorates from Heriot-Watt University in Scotland in 1994, the University of Strathclyde in Scotland in 1985, Waseda University in Japan in 2001, and Pacific Lutheran University in Tacoma, Washington, in 2015. He is also an honorary fellow at Balliol College, Oxford.

 – Freedom of the City of Cork.
Spirit of Luther Award, awarded by Luther College of Decorah, IA
A 230,000 km2 area in Antarctica is named Prince Harald Coast in his honour.
In 2007 King Harald was awarded the Holmenkollen medal with Simon Ammann, Frode Estil, Odd-Bjørn Hjelmeset, and his wife Queen Sonja.
 – Key of Honor to the City of Lisbon, on 28 May 2008
In 2013, a 6,500 km2 area in Svalbard was named Harald V Land.

Issue

Notes

References

External links 

 
 Official website of the Norwegian Royal Family: biography of the King
 Summary biography of the King
 The Royals – Regularly updated news coverage of the Norwegian royal family (Aftenposten)
 The Royal Norwegian Order of St Olav
 The Royal Norwegian Order of St Olav – H.M. King Harald V the Grand Master of the Order
 Announcement of King Harald V & Queen Sonja's awarding of the Holmenkollen medal  – Accessed 18 March 2007
 His Majesty The King's Life Guard 
 
 

1937 births
20th-century Norwegian monarchs
21st-century Norwegian monarchs
Alumni of Balliol College, Oxford
Holmenkollen medalists
House of Glücksburg (Norway)
Living people
Norwegian Lutherans
Norwegian monarchs
Crown Princes of Norway
Norwegian people of German descent
Norwegian people of Danish descent
Norwegian people of English descent
Norwegian people of Swedish descent
Norwegian people of French descent
Norwegian male sailors (sport)
Olympic sailors of Norway
People educated at Oslo Cathedral School
Protestant monarchs
Regents of Norway
Royal Olympic participants
Sailors at the 1964 Summer Olympics – 5.5 Metre
Sailors at the 1968 Summer Olympics – 5.5 Metre
Sailors at the 1972 Summer Olympics – Soling
University of Oslo alumni
Norwegian Military Academy alumni
Norwegian Army generals
Royal Norwegian Navy admirals
Royal Norwegian Air Force generals

Extra Knights Companion of the Garter
Grand Collars of the Order of Prince Henry
Grand Collars of the Order of Saint James of the Sword
Grand Commanders of the Order of the Dannebrog
Grand Croix of the Légion d'honneur
Grand Crosses of the Order of Aviz
Grand Crosses Special Class of the Order of Merit of the Federal Republic of Germany
Grand Crosses of the Order of the Crown (Netherlands)
First Class of the Order of the Star of Romania
Grand Crosses with Chain of the Order of Merit of the Republic of Hungary (civil)
Grand Crosses with Golden Chain of the Order of Vytautas the Great
Honorary Knights Grand Cross of the Royal Victorian Order
Harald V of Norway
Knights Grand Cross with Collar of the Order of Merit of the Italian Republic
Knights of the Golden Fleece of Spain
Recipients of the Collar of the Order of the Cross of Terra Mariana
Recipients of the Grand Star of the Decoration for Services to the Republic of Austria
Recipients of the Olympic Order
Recipients of the Order of the Phoenix (Greece)
Recipients of the St. Olav's Medal
Sons of kings
Recipients of the Order of the White Eagle (Poland)